The 2020–21 Naisten Liiga season was the thirty-eighth season of the Naisten Liiga, Finland's elite women's ice hockey league, since the league’s creation in 1982. The season began, as scheduled, on 5 September 2020, making the Naisten Liiga the first women's national ice hockey league in Europe and, quite likely, in the world to return to play for the 2020–21 season.

League business

Number of teams 
When the 2019–20 Naisten Liiga season was cancelled due to the COVID-19 pandemic, the league qualification series had not been completed. At the time of cancellation, Lukko Naiset had amassed an unreachable points advantage and secured their place in the Naisten Liiga and APV Naiset had been mathematically relegated to the Naisten Mestis but it was still possible for either RoKi Naiset or TPS Naiset to qualify. Recognizing that it would be unfair to relegate either RoKi or TPS, the Finnish Ice Hockey Association announced that both teams would participate in the 2020–21 Naisten Liiga season, increasing the number of teams in the preliminary round from ten to eleven.

League placement rankings 
In an effort to account for expected cancellations of some matches due to COVID-19 safety protocols, the Finnish Ice Hockey Association announced league rankings would be determined by the average points per game of each team rather than the absolute point total traditionally used. For example, a team with two wins in two games played (6 points total, average 3.0) ranks higher in the league table than a team with four wins, one overtime loss, and one regulation loss (13 points total, average 2.17).

Coaching changes

Teams

Preliminary series 
The addition of another team necessitated slight modification of the season format introduced for the 2019–20 season. With eleven participating teams, the twenty-game preliminary series was played strictly as a double round-robin without the addition of the two extra Opening Weekend Tournament games typically needed. The preliminaries were scheduled to be played during 5 September to 13 December 2020.

The season began as scheduled on 5 September 2020, making the Naisten Liiga the first women's national ice hockey league in Europe – and, quite possibly, in the world – to return to play for the 2020–21 season. The first game of the season saw Ilves Tampere beat TPS Turku 4–3 in overtime at Tesoman jäähalli. 

On 1 December 2020, an emergency meeting of the Finnish Ice Hockey Association was held in response to a significant rise in cases and hospitalizations related to the COVID-19 pandemic in Finland during the preceding weeks. It was ultimately determined that all leagues under the Association’s administration would suspend play from 2 to 31 December 2020, including the Naisten Liiga. The Naisten Liiga was expected to begin the regular season and lower division series in January, as outlined in the original season schedule, though the Finnish Ice Hockey Association expressed a desire to stage the games postponed during the period of suspended activity when play resumed.

Later in December, it was decided that Naisten Liiga teams would not attempt to play the games missed during the pause and would instead proceed directly to the regular season. With this determination, 29 November 2020 retroactively became the last day of the preliminary series, as it was the last day in which Naisten Liiga games were contested before the suspension.

Standings 
Kiekko-Espoo and KalPa, the two teams from the cancelled 2020 Aurora Borealis Cup final, continued to dominate the league in the preliminaries, ranking first and second at the conclusion of the series. Less expected were the third and fourth ranked teams, HIFK and TPS, which had both played in the lower division during the previous season and TPS had very nearly been eliminated in the 2020 qualifiers. Both teams were bolstered in the 2020–21 season by an influx of international talent. 

Kiekko-Espoo were the regular season champions for the third consecutive season.

Official ranking

Statistics 
Scoring leaders

The following players led the league in points at the conclusion of the preliminaries on 29 November 2020.

 

Leading goaltenders

The following goaltenders lead the league in save percentage at the conclusion of the preliminaries on 29 November 2020, while starting at least one third of matches.

Regular season  
The ten-game Naisten Liiga regular season, also called the upper division series, is played by the six top-ranked teams from the preliminary series. 

Following the December stoppage, play resumed on 8 January 2021. The decision was made to begin the regular season (upper and lower divisional series) rather than attempt to makeup the games missed during the pause, resulting in teams with seventeen to nineteen games played at the conclusion of the preliminaries. As the league had already adopted the use of points per game for league rankings, the impact of dropping the missed games on the remainder of the season was negligible.

Standings

Official ranking

Statistics 
Scoring leaders

The following players led the league in points at the conclusion of the regular season on 28 February 2021.

 

Leading goaltenders

The following goaltenders lead the league in save percentage at the conclusion of the regular season on 27 February 2021, while starting at least one third of matches.

Lower division series 
The lower division series was modified to be played by the five lowest-ranked teams from the preliminary series, rather than the standard four, and the top team from the cross-qualifiers of the Naisten Mestis, rather than the top-two from the cross-qualifiers, to account for the additional Naisten Liiga team. The series was originally scheduled to be played during 16 January to 21 February 2021 but was ultimately played during 9 January to 28 February 2021.

Standings 

Official ranking

Statistics 
Scoring leaders

The following players led the lower division in points at the conclusion of the series on 28 February 2021.

 

Leading goaltenders

The following goaltenders lead the lower division in save percentage at the conclusion of the series  on 28 February 2021, while starting at least one third of matches.

Playoffs

Qualification series
Two teams from the 2020 qualification series, RoKi and Lukko, returned to the relegation tournament in 2021, joined by Vaasan Sport, the eighth seed of the 2020 playoffs, and JYP, the team promoted mid-season to the lower division series. 

After amassing 22 points and a 2.20 points average in the lower division series, RoKi needed just one three-point (regulation) victory in the qualification series to amass an unbeatable point advantage and retain their place in the Naisten Liiga. They earned the necessary three points in the first match of the series, against JYP. Skaters Moona Keskisarja and Jenna Pirttijärvi both ranked in the top ten of the series for point totals and their goaltender with the best save percentage was Olivia Last, at .910, and best goals against average was Janita Haapasaari, with 2.50. 

JYP had very little hope of qualifying for the 2021–22 Naisten Liiga season, after concluding the lower division series with just four points in ten games. Over the six games of the qualification series, they were able to collect points only in one overtime victory and two overtime losses and were conclusively relegated to the Naisten Mestis. Their top point scorer was Anna Vanhala, one of four remaining players from 2015–16 JYP roster that won the Finnish Championship, and their best goaltender was Juuli Kivimäki. 

The second qualifying position was hotly contested by Lukko and Sport, as the teams came out of the lower division series with only one point separating them.

Standings 

Official ranking

Results

Statistics 
Scoring leaders

The following players led scoring in the qualification series at the conclusion of the series on 21 March 2021.

 

Leading goaltenders

The following goaltenders played at least one match in the qualification series, sorted by save percentage.

Awards and honours

Finnish Ice Hockey Association awards

 Riikka Nieminen Award (Player of the Year): Elisa Holopainen, KalPa
 Tuula Puputti Award (Best goaltender): Anni Keisala, Ilves
 Päivi Halonen Award (Best defenceman): Nelli Laitinen, Kiekko-Espoo
 Katja Riipi Award (Best forward): Elisa Holopainen, KalPa
 Noora Räty Award (Rookie of the Year): Anna-Kaisa Antti-Roiko, Kärpät
 Marianne Ihalainen Award (Top point scorer): Michaela Pejzlová, HIFK
 Tiia Reima Award (Top goal scorer): Matilda Nilsson, KalPa
 Sari Fisk Award (Best plus/minus): Emilia Vesa, Kiekko-Espoo
 Emma Laaksonen Award (Fair-play player): Johanna Juutilainen, KalPa
 Student Athlete Award: Anni Hietaharju, HIFK
 U18 Student Athlete Award: Nea Tervonen, Kuortane
 Hannu Saintula Award (Coach of the Year): Saara Niemi, HIFK
 Karoliina Rantamäki Award (MVP of the Playoffs): Tiia Pajarinen, Kiekko-Espoo
 Anu Hirvonen Award (Best referee): Anniina Nurmi
 Johanna Suban Award (Best linesman): Tiina Saarimäki

Source: Finnish Ice Hockey Association, Jääkiekkokirja 2022

Czech forward Michaela Pejzlová of HIFK Naiset claimed the Marianne Ihalainen Award as regular season scoring champion, the first international player to ever win a league award. KalPa Naiset winger Matilda Nilsson was the top goalscorer of the regular season and became the second KalPa player to receive the Tiia Reima Award.

All-Star Teams

All-Star Team
 Goaltender: Anni Keisala, Ilves
 Defenceman: Nelli Laitinen, Kiekko-Espoo
 Defenceman: Anna Kilponen, Ilves
 Winger: Elisa Holopainen, KalPa
 Center: Estelle Duvin, TPS
 Winger: Matilda Nilsson, KalPa

All-Star Team II
 Goaltender: Tiina Ranne, KalPa
 Defenceman: Athéna Locatelli, HIFK
 Defenceman: Krista Parkkonen, HIFK
 Winger: Emilia Vesa, Kiekko-Espoo
 Center: Michaela Pejzlová, HIFK
 Winger: Jenna Suokko, Ilves

Source: Finnish Ice Hockey Association, Jääkiekkokirja 2022

Player of the Month 

 September 2020: Elisa Holopainen (F), KalPa Kuopio
 October 2020: Nelli Laitinen (D), Kiekko-Espoo
 November 2020: Estelle Duvin (F), TPS Turku
December 2020: not awarded (no games played)
January 2021: Anni Keisala (G), Ilves Tampere
February 2021: Emilia Vesa (F), Kiekko-Espoo

Milestones 

On 19 September 2020, HPK forward and captain Riikka Noronen played her 600th game in the Naisten Liiga, becoming the first player in league history to reach the milestone.
On 17 January 2021, Ilves forward Emilia Varpula and KalPa defenceman Eveliina Nurmi played their 200th games in the Naisten Liiga.

References

External links 
 Naisten Liiga official website (in Finnish)

Naisten Liiga (ice hockey) seasons
Naisten Liiga season, 2020–21
Naisten Liiga season, 2020–21
Naisten Liiga season, 2020–21
2020–21 in women's ice hockey leagues